Terje Hals (7 February 1937 – 19 December 2010) was a Norwegian jurist and police chief.

He was born in Drammen, and graduated with the cand.jur. in 1962. He was a police superintendent in Uttrøndelag from 1970 and police inspector from 1971. He served as chief of police in Troms from 1976 to 1986 and in Moss from 1986 to 2001.

References

1937 births
2010 deaths
People from Drammen
Norwegian jurists
Norwegian police chiefs